The Red Warriors are a Japanese rock band founded in 1985. The band played themselves in the 1988 film Tokyo Pop, with lead singer Tadokoro playing the love interest of the American girl in Japan.

Discography
Lesson 1 1986
Casino Drive 1987
King's 1988
King's Rock'n'Roll Show - Live at the Seibu Stadium 1988
Swingin' Daze 1989
Red Song 1989
Red's Box 1992
The World of the Red Warriors 1996
Fire Drops 1997
Live Dogs 2000
Jupiter Tribus 2000
Re:Works 2001
Live Lession 21 2007

References

Japanese rock music groups